St Dennis is a civil parish and village in Cornwall, England, United Kingdom. The village is situated on the B3279 between Newquay and St Austell.

St Dennis had a population of 2,696 in the 2001 census, increasing to 2,810 at the 2011 census.  An electoral ward also exists with a population at the same census of 4,560.  A quarter of the male population is employed in the extraction of china clay.

The village is famous for its church built on the site of an Iron Age hillfort. Other major buildings include the Methodist chapel and the Boscawen Hotel.

History
St Dennis originated as several smaller settlements: Hendra, Trelavour and Whitepit. The area's population grew rapidly after William Cookworthy discovered China Clay in the area.

Geography
The area is characterised by tips and pits of china clay mining but St Dennis village itself is designated an 'island settlement' which prevents encroachment by the china clay industry. Much of the parish is up to 500 feet above sea level, and the countryside is moorland with small fields enclosed by earth-covered granite walls known as 'hedges'. These hedges were constructed centuries ago, when the land was cleared for farming. Part of Trelavour Downs has been designated a Site of Special Scientific Interest and a Geological Conservation Review site. A small shallow pit of 0.3 ha was once worked for lithium and is the best known locality for biotite mica in Britain.

Churches and chapels

The church is situated on top of a hill overlooking the village and has views over Goss Moor to the sea at Newquay. It is dedicated to St Denys and stands on the site of an Iron Age fort. The tower is the oldest part of the church, and the newer church was almost destroyed by fire in 1985. Although heartbreaking at the time, it has risen again from the ashes. The new roof timbers were so large that they had to be lifted in by a Royal Navy Sea King helicopter.

The village also has a strong history of Methodism and at one stage there were three Methodist chapels in the village. Of these three, Carne Hill is the only chapel which is still open to this day.

The churchyard cross has a head of horseshoe shape and is ornamented with some unusual incised ornament.

Education and social life
The infant school in St Dennis has been amalgamated with the new primary school, and the old building has been refurbished and is now used as an outreach centre called ClayTAWC. The centre teaches computer studies to adults in the area, and also has many other interesting classes.

St Dennis Band is based in the village, and has a history of competing with some of the world's top bands. The Band recently gained Championship Status in 2017. Last year the band went to Blackpool, retaining their Championship status for another year. Currently they are the WEBF Champions.

The village of St Dennis has two public houses, The Commercial Inn and the Boscawen Hotel, and there are also three clubs, the St Dennis Working Men's Club, the St Dennis Band Club, and St Dennis A.F.C.

Technology

The Land Master all-terrain vehicle was developed here in the late 1970s.

The Cornwall Energy Recovery Centre A is an incinerator being built near St Dennis by French company SITA. The first planning application was submitted in 2008. The initial planning application was rejected in 2009 following opposition by the Parish Council over worried about the effects of pollution and extra traffic. Following a Public Inquiry 2011 permission was granted and construction began in 2012. A later High Court challenge from the Cornwall Waste Forum delayed construction and the case went to the Court of Appeal  at the Royal Courts of Justice which unanimously rejected the Cornwall Waste Forum's claim in March 2012. A further challenge at the Supreme Court also failed. Work restarted in August 2012 which is being carried out by CORMAC, a company wholly owned by Cornwall Council. SITA claim that the Cornwall Energy Recovery Centre (CERC) will benefit Cornwall by diverting 90 per cent of the county’s residual waste away from landfill and will generate sixteen megawatts of electricity. The local community has received hundreds of thousands of pounds in compensation.

Railway lines
The railway station for St Dennis is St Columb Road but there have been mineral railways in the parish, for which see article St Dennis railway station.

References

External links

 

Civil parishes in Cornwall
Villages in Cornwall
Hill forts in Cornwall